Kgoshikgolo Thulare III, also known as King Victor Thulare III (24 December 1980 – 6 January 2021) was the king of the Pedi people (BaPedi Kingdom) in South Africa. He was best known as being an economic freedom fighter for land and justice. He died on 6 January 2021, from COVID-19 complications during the COVID-19 pandemic in South Africa. He was 40 years of age. King Thulare III's funeral was held on 17 January 2021 in Mohlaletsi, Limpopo, South Africa. He received a Special Official Category 1 funeral. The eulogy was delivered by President Cyril Ramaphosa of South Africa.

Background
King Thulare III was the son of King Rhyane Thulare Sekhukhune III who died in 2007. At the time Thulare III was too young to be crowned as king.

Thulare III took leadership as the king of Pedi in July 2020, after a legal protracted battle in court. He disputed the kingship of the acting king his uncle Kgagudi Kenneth Sekhukhune who fought for his son Sekwati II Khutjo Sekhukhune to be the heir. A Constitutional court ruling in 2018 recognized Thulare III as the incumbent.

His inauguration was supposed to have taken place in 2021.

Wives

1st wife Queen Phindile Ntombifuthi Thulare (they had 2 boys) 
2nd wife Queen Zimkhitha Swartbooi (they had 2 boys and 1 girl)

References

External links
King Victor Thulare III funeral
Eulogy by President Cyril Ramaphosa at the funeral of king Thulare Victor Thulare III of the Bapedi kingdom

Monarchs of South Africa
2021 deaths
Bapedi monarchy
People from Limpopo
South African Republic
Northern Sotho people
Deaths from the COVID-19 pandemic in South Africa
1980 births